Unholy Ground is the fourth studio album by Finnish rock band Sunrise Avenue. It was released on 18 October 2013 by Universal Music.

Track listing
 "Unholy Ground"
 "Lifesaver"
 "Little Bit Love"
 "I Can Break Your Heart"
 "Hurtsville"
 "Letters in the Sand"
 "Girl Like You"
 "If I Fall"
 "Aim for the Kill"
 "Don't Cry (Don't Think About It)"
 "Afraid of the Midnight"

Charts

Weekly charts

Year-end charts

Certifications

References

Sunrise Avenue albums
2013 albums
Universal Music Group albums